carbon fixation or the Hatch–Slack pathway is one of three known photosynthetic processes of carbon fixation in plants. It owes the names to the 1960's discovery by Marshall Davidson Hatch and Charles Roger Slack that some plants, when supplied with 14, incorporate the 14C label into four-carbon molecules first.

 fixation is an addition to the ancestral and more common  carbon fixation. The main carboxylating enzyme in  photosynthesis is called RuBisCO, which catalyses two distinct reactions using either  (carboxylation) or oxygen (oxygenation) as a substrate. The latter process, oxygenation, gives rise to the wasteful process of photorespiration.  photosynthesis reduces photorespiration by concentrating  around RuBisCO. OAA can be chemically reduced to malate or transaminated to aspartate. These intermediates diffuse to the bundle sheath cells, where they are decarboxylated, creating a -rich environment around RuBisCO and thereby suppressing photorespiration. The resulting pyruvate (PYR), together with about half of the phosphoglycerate (PGA) produced by RuBisCO, diffuses back to the mesophyll. PGA is then chemically reduced and diffuses back to the bundle sheath to complete the reductive pentose phosphate cycle (RPP). This exchange of metabolites is essential for  photosynthesis to work.

On one hand, these additional steps require more energy in the form of ATP to regenerate PEP. On the other hand, concentrating  allows high rates of photosynthesis at higher temperatures. Higher concentration overcomes the reduction of gas solubility with temperature (Henry's law). The  concentrating mechanism also maintains high gradients of  concentration across the stomatal pores. This means that  plants have generally lower stomatal conductance, reduced water losses and have generally higher water-use efficiency.  plants are also more efficient in using nitrogen, since PEP carboxylase is much cheaper to make than RuBisCO. However, since the  pathway does not require extra energy for the regeneration of PEP, it is more efficient in conditions where photorespiration is limited, typically at low temperatures and in the shade.

Discovery
The first experiments indicating that some plants do not use  carbon fixation but instead produce malate and aspartate in the first step of carbon fixation were done in the 1950s and early 1960s by Hugo Peter Kortschak and Yuri Karpilov. The  pathway was elucidated by Marshall Davidson Hatch and Charles Roger Slack, in Australia, in 1966. While Hatch and Slack originally referred to the pathway as the "C4 dicarboxylic acid pathway", it is sometimes called the Hatch–Slack pathway.

Anatomy 

 plants often possess a characteristic leaf anatomy called kranz anatomy, from the German word for wreath. Their vascular bundles are surrounded by two rings of cells; the inner ring, called bundle sheath cells, contains starch-rich chloroplasts lacking grana, which differ from those in mesophyll cells present as the outer ring. Hence, the chloroplasts are called dimorphic. The primary function of kranz anatomy is to provide a site in which  can be concentrated around RuBisCO, thereby avoiding photorespiration. Mesophyll and bundle sheath cells are connected through numerous cytoplasmic sleeves called plasmodesmata whose permeability at leaf level is called bundle sheath conductance. The carbon concentration mechanism in  plants distinguishes their isotopic signature from other photosynthetic organisms.

Although most  plants exhibit kranz anatomy, there are, however, a few species that operate a limited  cycle without any distinct bundle sheath tissue. Suaeda aralocaspica, Bienertia cycloptera, Bienertia sinuspersici and Bienertia kavirense (all chenopods) are terrestrial plants that inhabit dry, salty depressions in the deserts of the Middle East. These plants have been shown to operate single-cell  -concentrating mechanisms, which are unique among the known  mechanisms. Although the cytology of both genera differs slightly, the basic principle is that fluid-filled vacuoles are employed to divide the cell into two separate areas. Carboxylation enzymes in the cytosol are separated from decarboxylase enzymes and RuBisCO in the chloroplasts. A diffusive barrier is between the chloroplasts (which contain RuBisCO) and the cytosol. This enables a bundle-sheath-type area and a mesophyll-type area to be established within a single cell. Although this does allow a limited  cycle to operate, it is relatively inefficient.

There is also evidence of inducible  photosynthesis by non-kranz aquatic macrophyte Hydrilla verticillata under warm conditions, although the mechanism by which  leakage from around RuBisCO is minimised is currently uncertain.

Biochemistry 
However, RuBisCo has a dual carboxylase and oxygenase activity. Oxygenation results in part of the substrate being oxidized rather than carboxylated, resulting in loss of substrate and consumption of energy, in what is known as photorespiration.

In order to reduce the rate of photorespiration,  plants increase the concentration of  around RuBisCO. To do so two partially isolated compartments differentiate within leaves, the mesophyll and the bundle sheath. Instead of direct fixation by RuBisCO,  is initially incorporated into a four-carbon organic acid (either malate or aspartate) in the mesophyll. The organic acids then diffuse through plasmodesmata into the bundle sheath cells.  There, they are decarboxylated creating a -rich environment. The chloroplasts of the bundle sheath cells convert this  into carbohydrates by the conventional  pathway.

There is large variability in the biochemical features of C4 assimilation, and it is generally grouped in three subtypes, differentiated by the main enzyme used for decarboxylation ( NADP-malic enzyme, NADP-ME; NAD-malic enzyme, NAD-ME; and PEP carboxykinase, PEPCK). Since PEPCK is often recruited atop NADP-ME or NAD-ME it was proposed to classify the biochemical variability in two subtypes. For instance, maize and sugarcane use a combination of NADP-ME and PEPCK, millet uses preferentially NAD-ME and Megathyrsus maximus, uses preferentially PEPCK.

NADP-ME
The first step in the NADP-ME type  pathway is the conversion of pyruvate (Pyr) to phosphoenolpyruvate (PEP), by the enzyme Pyruvate phosphate dikinase (PPDK). This reaction requires inorganic phosphate and ATP plus pyruvate, producing PEP, AMP, and inorganic pyrophosphate (PPi). The next step is the carboxylation of PEP by the PEP carboxylase enzyme (PEPC) producing oxaloacetate. Both of these steps occur in the mesophyll cells:

pyruvate + Pi + ATP → PEP + AMP + PPi
PEP +  → oxaloacetate

The product is usually converted to malate (M), which diffuses to the bundle-sheath cells surrounding a nearby vein. Here, it is decarboxylated by the NADP-malic enzyme (NADP-ME) to produce  and pyruvate. The  is fixed by RuBisCo to produce phosphoglycerate (PGA) while the pyruvate is transported back to the mesophyll cell, together with about half of the phosphoglycerate (PGA). This PGA is chemically reduced in the mesophyll and diffuses back to the bundle sheath where it enters the conversion phase of the Calvin cycle. For each  molecule exported to the bundle sheath the malate shuttle transfers two electrons, and therefore reduces the demand of reducing power in the bundle sheath.

NAD-ME

Here, the OAA produced by PEPC is transaminated by aspartate aminotransferase to aspartate (ASP) which is the metabolite diffusing to the bundle sheath. In the bundle sheath ASP is transaminated again to OAA and then undergoes a futile reduction and oxidative decarboxylation to release . The resulting Pyruvate is transaminated to alanine, diffusing to the mesophyll. Alanine is finally transaminated to pyruvate (PYR) which can be regenerated to PEP by PPDK in the mesophyll chloroplasts. This cycle bypasses the reaction of malate dehydrogenase in the mesophyll and therefore does not transfer reducing equivalents to the bundle sheath.

PEPCK

In this variant the OAA produced by aspartate aminotransferase in the bundle sheath is decarboxylated to PEP by PEPCK. The fate of PEP is still debated. The simplest explanation is that PEP would diffuse back to the mesophyll to serve as a substrate for PEPC. Because PEPCK uses only one ATP molecule, the regeneration of PEP through PEPCK would theoretically increase photosynthetic efficiency of this subtype, however this has never been measured. An increase in relative expression of PEPCK has been observed under low light, and it has been proposed to play a role in facilitating balancing energy requirements between mesophyll and bundle sheath.

Metabolite exchange
While in  photosynthesis each chloroplast is capable of completing light reactions and dark reactions,  chloroplasts differentiate in two populations, contained in the mesophyll and bundle sheath cells. The division of the photosynthetic work between two types of chloroplasts results inevitably in a prolific exchange of intermediates between them. The fluxes are large and can be up to ten times the rate of gross assimilation. The type of metabolite exchanged and the overall rate will depend on the subtype. To reduce product inhibition of photosynthetic enzymes (for instance PECP) concentration gradients need to be as low as possible. This requires increasing the conductance of metabolites between mesophyll and bundle sheath, but this would also increase the retrodiffusion of  out of the bundle sheath, resulting in an inherent and inevitable trade off in the optimisation of the  concentrating mechanism.

Light harvesting and light reactions 
To meet the NADPH and ATP demands in the mesophyll and bundle sheath, light needs to be harvested and shared between two distinct electron transfer chains. ATP may be produced in the bundle sheath mainly through cyclic electron flow around Photosystem I, or in the M mainly through linear electron flow depending on the light available in the bundle sheath or in the mesophyll. The relative requirement of ATP and NADPH in each type of cells will depend on the photosynthetic subtype. The apportioning of excitation energy between the two cell types will influence the availability of ATP and NADPH in the mesohyll and bundle sheath. For instance, green light is not strongly adsorbed by mesophyll cells and can preferentially excite bundle sheath cells, or vice versa for blue light. Because bundle sheaths are surrounded by mesophyll, light harvesting in the mesophyll will reduce the light available to reach BS cells. Also, the bundle sheath size limits the amount of light that can be harvested.

Efficiency 
Different formulations of efficiency are possible depending on which outputs and inputs are considered. For instance, average quantum efficiency is the ratio between gross assimilation and either absorbed or incident light intensity. Large variability of measured quantum efficiency is reported in the literature between plants grown in different conditions and classified in different subtypes but the underpinnings are still unclear. One of the components of quantum efficiency is the efficiency of dark reactions, biochemical efficiency, which is generally expressed in reciprocal terms as ATP cost of gross assimilation (ATP/GA). When  concentration is high and O2 concentration is low photorespiration is suppressed and  assimilation is fast and efficient, with ATP/GA approaching the theoretical minimum of 3. In  photosynthesis  concentration at the RuBisCO carboxylating sites is mainly the result of the operation of the  concentrating mechanisms, which cost circa an additional 2 ATP/GA but makes efficiency relatively insensitive of external  concentration in a broad range of conditions. Biochemical efficiency depends mainly on the speed of  delivery to the bundle sheath, and will generally decrease under low light when PEP carboxylation rate decreases, lowering the ratio of /O2 concentration at the carboxylating sites of RuBisCO. The key parameter defining how much efficiency will decrease under low light is bundle sheath conductance. Plants with higher bundle sheath conductance will be facilitated in the exchange of metabolites between the mesophyll and bundle sheath and will be capable of high rates of assimilation under high light. However, they will also have high rates of  retrodiffusion from the bundle sheath (called leakage) which will increase photorespiration and decrease biochemical efficiency under dim light. This represents an inherent and inevitable trade off in the operation of  photosynthesis.  plants have an outstanding capacity to attune bundle sheath conductance. Interestingly, bundle sheath conductance is downregulated in plants grown under low light and in plants grown under high light subsequently transferred to low light as it occurs in crop canopies where older leaves are shaded by new growth.

Evolution and advantages

 plants have a competitive advantage over plants possessing the more common  carbon fixation pathway under conditions of drought, high temperatures, and nitrogen or  limitation. When grown in the same environment, at 30 °C,  grasses lose approximately 833 molecules of water per  molecule that is fixed, whereas  grasses lose only 277. This increased water use efficiency of  grasses means that soil moisture is conserved, allowing them to grow for longer in arid environments.

 carbon fixation has evolved in up to 61 independent occasions in 19 different families of plants, making it a prime example of convergent evolution. Drought was not necessary for its innovation; rather, the increased parsimony in water use was a byproduct of the pathway and allowed  plants to more readily colonize arid environments.

Today,  plants represent about 5% of Earth's plant biomass and 3% of its known plant species. Despite this scarcity, they account for about 23% of terrestrial carbon fixation. Present-day  plants are concentrated in the tropics and subtropics (below latitudes of 45 degrees) where the high air temperature increases rates of photorespiration in  plants.

Plants that use  carbon fixation

About 8,100 plant species use  carbon fixation, which represents about 3% of all terrestrial species of plants. All these 8,100 species are angiosperms.  carbon fixation is more common in monocots compared with dicots, with 40% of monocots using the  pathway, compared with only 4.5% of dicots. Despite this, only three families of monocots use  carbon fixation compared to 15 dicot families. Various kinds of millet are also . Of the dicot clades containing  species, the order Caryophyllales contains the most species. Of the families in the Caryophyllales, the Chenopodiaceae use  carbon fixation the most, with 550 out of 1,400 species using it. About 250 of the 1,000 species of the related Amaranthaceae also use .

Members of the sedge family Cyperaceae, and members of numerous families of eudicots – including Asteraceae (the daisy family), Brassicaceae (the cabbage family), and Euphorbiaceae (the spurge family) – also use .

There are very few trees which use . Only a handful are known: Paulownia, seven Hawaiian Euphorbia species and a few desert shrubs that reach the size and shape of trees with age.

Converting  plants to 

As rice is the world's most important human food—it is the staple food for more than half the planet—having rice that is more efficient at converting sunlight into grain could have significant global benefits towards improving food security. The team claim  rice could produce up to 50% more grain—and be able to do it with less water and nutrients.

The researchers have already identified genes needed for  photosynthesis in rice and are now looking towards developing a prototype  rice plant. In 2012, the Government of the United Kingdom along with the Bill & Melinda Gates Foundation provided US$14 million over three years towards the  Rice Project at the International Rice Research Institute. In 2019, the Bill & Melinda Gates Foundation granted another US$15 million to the Oxford-University-led C4 Rice Project. The goal of the 5-year project is to have experimental field plots up and running in Taiwan by 2024.

In 2021, the UK Government provided GB£1.2 million on studying C2 engineering.

See also 
 C2 photosynthesis
 CAM photosynthesis
  photosynthesis

References

External links 
 Khan Academy, video lecture

Photosynthesis